Groupe Sportive de Neuves-Maisons is a French sports club founded in 1907. The club is based in the commune of Neuves-Maisons and their home stadium is the Stade Municipal André Courrier. As of the 2009–10 season, the club's association football team competes in the Championnat de France amateur 2 Group C.

External links
GS Neuves-Maisons official website 

Neuves-Maisons
1907 establishments in France
Sport in Meurthe-et-Moselle
Football clubs in Grand Est